Stefan Zamosius (Szamosközy) (1570–1612) was a Hungarian humanist and historian.

Life
Szamosközy was born in Kolozsvár, Transylvania (now Cluj-Napoca, Romania) to a Calvinist family. He completed his studies at Heidelberg and Padova. In 1593 he returned to Transylvania and started to work at Gyulafehérvár for the archive of the Transylvanian court. There he started collecting materials and writing his major work on Hungarian history.

Stephen Bocskai nominated him as the official court historian.

Works
 In Padova he published a Collection of Roman inscriptions in Dacia
 he published also a numismatic treatise

His unfinished Hungarian history was never published but parts are extant in many manuscript copies. Farkas Bethlen saved longer parts in his Transylvanian history. He designed his work based on the example of Antonio Bonfini's Decades (Tenths). Sándor Szilágyi published Szamosközy's works in four volumes in Szamosközy történeti maradványai, Budapest 1876–1880.

 Hebdomanes (Sevenths)
 Pentates (Fifths)
 History of the year 1594
 Analecta lapidum vetustorum et nonnullarum in Dacia antiquitatum

Literature
  
 

1570 births
1612 deaths
17th-century Hungarian historians
16th-century Hungarian historians
17th-century philologists
Hungarian chroniclers
Hungarian Finno-Ugrists
Hungarian philologists
Historians of Hungary
Hungarian Protestants
Hungarian Calvinist and Reformed Christians
Writers from Cluj-Napoca